Alicia Molik and Magüi Serna were the defending champions but only Molik competed that year with Bryanne Stewart.

Molik and Stewart lost in the first round to Antonella Serra Zanetti and Abigail Spears.

Lisa Raymond and Rennae Stubbs won in the final 6–3, 7–5 against Elena Likhovtseva and Vera Zvonareva.

Seeds
Champion seeds are indicated in bold text while text in italics indicates the round in which those seeds were eliminated.

 Cara Black /  Liezel Huber (semifinals)
 Lisa Raymond /  Rennae Stubbs (champions)
 Elena Likhovtseva /  Vera Zvonareva (final)
 Alicia Molik /  Bryanne Stewart (first round)

Draw

External links
2005 Hastings Direct International Championships Doubles draw

Doubles
Hastings Direct International Championships